Adam Brunskill is a 1952 historical novel by the British writer Thomas Armstrong. It was his fourth novel and as with much of his work focuses on Northern England. Drawing on the tradition of interwar regional writing of the area, it enjoyed significant popularity along with another new Armstrong novel King Cotton. It is the only major work to focus on the lead mining industry of the Yorkshire Dales.

Synopsis
In the 1880s, a young man raised in Spain in the expatriate British mining community of Andalusia returns to his father's native England.

References

Bibliography
 Hutchinson, Roger. Walking to America. Birlinn, 2013.
 Russell, Dave. Looking North: Northern England and the National Imagination. Manchester University Press, 2004.
 Snell, Keith. The Bibliography of Regional Fiction in Britain and Ireland, 1800–2000. Routledge, 2017.

1952 British novels
Novels by Thomas Armstrong
Novels set in Yorkshire
Novels set in Spain
British historical novels
Novels set in the 1880s
William Collins, Sons books